Kohimarama is a coastal residential Auckland suburb, located to the east of the city. Kohimarama is situated between Mission Bay and St Heliers and has an accessible beach with a boardwalk and green recreational spaces located amongst residential areas. Local government of Kohimarama is the responsibility of the Ōrākei Local Board, which also includes the suburbs of Ōrākei, Mission Bay, St Heliers, Glendowie, St Johns, Meadowbank, Remuera and Ellerslie.

Demographics

Kohimarama had a population of 4,350 at the 2018 New Zealand census, an increase of 207 people (5.0%) since the 2013 census, and an increase of 315 people (7.8%) since the 2006 census. There were 1,707 households, comprising 2,064 males and 2,283 females, giving a sex ratio of 0.9 males per female. The median age was 44.7 years (compared with 37.4 years nationally), with 753 people (17.3%) aged under 15 years, 603 (13.9%) aged 15 to 29, 2,106 (48.4%) aged 30 to 64, and 888 (20.4%) aged 65 or older.

Ethnicities were 83.9% European/Pākehā, 3.2% Māori, 1.4% Pacific peoples, 13.6% Asian, and 4.0% other ethnicities. People may identify with more than one ethnicity.

The percentage of people born overseas was 35.8, compared with 27.1% nationally.

Although some people chose not to answer the census's question about religious affiliation, 45.2% had no religion, 43.7% were Christian, 0.1% had Māori religious beliefs, 1.6% were Hindu, 0.8% were Muslim, 1.4% were Buddhist and 2.2% had other religions.

Of those at least 15 years old, 1,647 (45.8%) people had a bachelor's or higher degree, and 222 (6.2%) people had no formal qualifications. The median income was $53,000, compared with $31,800 nationally. 1,377 people (38.3%) earned over $70,000 compared to 17.2% nationally. The employment status of those at least 15 was that 1,857 (51.6%) people were employed full-time, 555 (15.4%) were part-time, and 81 (2.3%) were unemployed.

History 
Kohimarama was the original Māori name for Bastion Point which is now named Takaparawhau by owners Ngāti Whātua Ōrākei. 

Kohimarama’s former name was Waiparera, ‘duck water’, as the area was a breeding ground of the pārera, the wild grey duck. This name was used by  Māori and by Pākehā until 1870. 

Kohimarama used to be part of the 600-acre Kohimarama block of land sold by the Māori Ngāti Pāoa iwi (tribe) to the Crown in May 1841 for 200 pounds. The block was a large area, from Ōrākei-Mission Bay to the Tāmaki River and from the Waitematā Harbour to the outskirts of Panmure. As the iwi never received the advantages they expected from the sale, the price is considered "ridiculously low, even for the time".

Arriving in Auckland in 1841, William Field Porter, was a month too late for the first Government auction, but became the first settler in today’s Kohimarama after the second auction. Then the area consisted of a lagoon, a raupo swamp and the Kohimarama beach, the longest beach in the Harbour. Porter sent men to clear, fence and drain the area. One of these men was Thomas Kemp, later to be a landowner of the neighbouring suburb, Mission Bay.

The Kohimarama Wharf was built in 1912 on the Pipimea Head between Kohimarama and Mission Bay. The first business in Kohimarama was a tearoom which catered to the people arriving at the newly built wharf. The access to the wharf was not easy; people had to walk around the rocks to and from the wharf which ultimately led to the building of the road now known as Tamaki Drive.

From 1892 to 1919, Kohimarama was also known as the ‘Jockey Bay’, since the area was used as a training ground for race horses. In 1919, the stables were moved to Ronaki Road, Mission Bay, and the land in Kohimarama was leased to W.H. Madill, a dairy farmer.

Today, Kohimarama is one of the quieter beaches along Tamaki Drive and has cafes along the beach front. The Kohimarama Yacht Club is located on Tamaki Drive. This club was set up in 1939 for young people and the construction of the club house at Gower’s Point, between the Kohimarama and Saint Heliers, was finished in 1957.

In 2009 the Auckland City Council spent $10,000,000 to preserve the pōhutakawa trees by protecting the eroding sea wall. A boardwalk was created and sand was shipped from the northern beach of Pakiri. Naturalistic rock headlands were built and were the first of their kind along the Eastern Suburb beaches. They have become a part of the Tamaki Drive coastal landscape. The solution diverted storm water to either end of the beach and piped it out to a rock shelf. The rock headland formations were hand shaped and coloured to match the surrounding cliffs and recede into the existing environment.

Nature areas
Kohimarama has several nature reserves: Madills Farm Recreation Reserve, Mary Atkin Reserve, Kohimarama Beach Reserve, Sage Road Reserve and Speight Road Reserve. Madills Farm Recreation Reserve used to be part of W.H. Madill's dairy farm in 1919. There are four playing fields on the northern half of the reserve. Mary Atkin Reserve, named after an early missionary daughter, is a green open space where people can walk dogs. Kohimarama Beach Reserve is used for swimming. It is located east of the Kohimarama Yacht Club and boat races are held there. It has boat ramps, bicycle stands and toilets. Sage Road Reserve and Speight Road Reserve each function as an access way to Madills Farm Recreation Reserve.

Education 

All these schools are co-educational. Rolls are as of

Sports
The football (soccer) club Eastern Suburbs AFC, which competes in the Lotto Sport Italia NRFL Division 1 and was crowned champion in 2011, is based in Kohimarama. Other sports clubs are the Kohimarama Tennis Club, the Kohimarama Yacht Club and Kohimarama Bowling Club which was formerly known as the Mission Bay Women's Bowling Club. The club changed its name in October 2013 after changing the rules about allowing men to join the club.

Gallery

References 

 The Lively Capital, Auckland 1840-1865, Una Platts. Avon Fine Prints Limited New Zealand 1971.

External links
Photographs of Kohimarama held in Auckland Libraries' heritage collections.

Suburbs of Auckland
Populated places around the Hauraki Gulf / Tīkapa Moana
Ōrākei Local Board Area